The Kroombit tinker frog (Taudactylus pleione), also sometimes referred to as Pleione's torrent frog, is a species of frog in the family Myobatrachidae. It is endemic to Central Queensland in Australia. It lives among rocks and leaf litter near small flowing streams.

Conservation
As most other members of the genus Taudactylus, this species has declined drastically and is consequently considered critically endangered by the IUCN. The reason for this decline is unclear, but likely linked to the disease Chytridiomycosis (chytrid fungus). It may also be threatened by habitat loss.

It is listed as Critically Endangered on the IUCN Red List, and as Endangered under Queensland's Nature Conservation Act 1992 and critically endangered under the national EPBC Act.

The major threat to its existence, apart from climate change, less habitat and certain pests, remains chytrid fungus.

In 2020, Australian scientists at Currumbin Wildlife Sanctuary at Currumbin on the Gold Coast bred the Kroombit tinker frog in captivity for the first time, raising hopes of preventing extinction. They had been trying since around 2000, but it was only when the wildlife sanctuary came offered a frog-breeding facility in 2008 that the work could properly begin. They eventually managed to bring about a spawning by their captive frogs, and the first tadpole metamorphosed into a frog in November 2020.

References

Taudactylus
Frogs of Australia
Amphibians of Queensland
Endemic fauna of Australia
Amphibians described in 1986
Nature Conservation Act endangered biota
Taxonomy articles created by Polbot
Taxa named by Greg V. Czechura